L. Ron Hubbard, Messiah or Madman? is a posthumous biography of Scientology founder L. Ron Hubbard written by Bent Corydon, which makes extensive use of interviews he conducted with Hubbard's son Ronald DeWolf. Though originally published in 1987 by Lyle Stuart Inc., the book was re-issued in a paperback edition on July 25, 1992, and a hardcover edition in October 1995, both by publisher Barricade Books. The 1995 edition also featured Brian Ambry as principal researcher. The first edition of the book listed DeWolf as coauthor.

History

Corydon had previously been head of the Scientology mission at Riverside, California, and used letters, court transcripts, affidavits, and first-hand accounts to write the biography of L. Ron Hubbard, the founder of the Church of Scientology. In addition to extensive interviews with Ronald DeWolf, Hubbard's son by his first wife, Corydon corresponded with others, such as Sara Northrup Hollister, Hubbard's second wife.

In an open letter to the New York Times, Lyle Stuart, the book's publisher, said he had poured all the profits from the book into educational advertisements about Scientology. The letter described the group as a cult.

Prior to publication of the first edition, DeWolf retracted his statements and sued Stuart claiming that he had been misrepresented and the book was inaccurate. DeWolf also claimed Corydon had breached their authorship agreement, and that he had not been paid for his work. He demanded that the publisher remove his name from book. DeWolf's demands were not met, and the book was published naming DeWolf as co-author.

DeWolf died in 1991. In the 1992 edition of the book, Corydon said that he believed DeWolf was under duress due to debt and poor health when he made the retraction. The later editions of the book do not name DeWolf as an author, although his interviews are still used.

Legal challenges from the Church of Scientology

In order to prevent the publication of the biography, the Church of Scientology engaged the publisher, Lyle Stuart Inc., in a legal dispute, claiming copyright infringement. The claim was dismissed. The original cover design featured a volcano similar to the one depicted on the cover of Dianetics, but Scientology won an injunction against its use. The legal dispute was ongoing when the publisher wished to distribute the work, so Stuart altered the design of the book cover to instead feature a letter addressed "Dear Bookbuyer:"

The Church of Scientology, through its attorney Timothy Bowles, sent threatening letters to those planning to publish reviews of the book. The following message was sent to the St. Petersburg Times:

The newspaper refused to comply with Scientology's requests, and published not only the review, but also the letter. It went on to win an award from the Columbia Journalism Review.

Reception 

Writing for the Marburg Journal of Religion, historian and theologian Marco Frenschkowski (de) called the book "[A] very important book but also a deeply problematical item" and "Many of the claims made in Corydon's book are very sensationalist. It is quite believable that Hubbard Jr. was not happy with the book even when he wanted to expose the darker side of his father."

A New York Times book review stated, "This book, supposedly a biography of Hubbard (who died in 1986), turns out to be a series of tales about naïve people who were put through abusive tests before they were allowed to pay thousands of dollars to an organization that humiliated them... [Hubbard] is portrayed as a greedy, vindictive man whose hidden agenda centered on hoarding vast sums of money and escaping legal accountability."

See also

 A Piece of Blue Sky, also had been involved in legal issues with Scientology
 Bare Faced Messiah, biography, also had been involved in legal issues with Scientology
 Blown for Good, a memoir by a former Scientologist

References

Further reading 

 Understanding Scientology, Margery Wakefield, Chapter 2
 Brainwashing Manual Parallels in Scientology, by Brian Ambry
 The Ultimate Spin Doctor: L. Ron Hubbard – The Man and His Myth, Vol. 13, No. 5, 1996, The Watchman Expositor, Craig Branch
 Scientology's history of harassing writers of books, Ron Newman

External links

 Full Text of Messiah or Madman?, Operation Clambake, Plaintext version 1.0, August 18, 1998

1987 non-fiction books
American biographies
Books critical of Scientology
Books about Scientology
Books about L. Ron Hubbard
1987 in religion
Barricade Books titles